Skirgiškės is a village in Vilnius District Municipality, in Riešė Eldership, situated on the right bank of the Neris river. It is located near the Europos Parkas.

References 

Villages in Vilnius County